Kallar-e Sofla (also Romanized as Kallār-e Soflá; also known as Kallār-e Bāz‘alī and Kallār-e Pā’īn) is a village in Rig Rural District, in the Central District of Lordegan County, Chaharmahal and Bakhtiari Province, Iran. At the 2006 census, its population was 214, in 43 families.

References 

Populated places in Lordegan County